Sheldon High School  may refer to:
Sheldon High School (California)
Sheldon High School (Oregon)
Sheldon High School (Iowa)

For the high school serving Sheldon, Texas, see C.E. King High School